Kevin Eugene Lunday (born October 12, 1965) is a United States Coast Guard vice admiral who serves as commander of the Coast Guard Atlantic Area since May 24, 2022,and director, Homeland Security Joint Task Force – East once the appointment is confirmed. He most recently served as the deputy for materiel readiness to the deputy commandant for mission support of the United States Coast Guard from July 2020 to April 2022. Lunday also previously commanded the Coast Guard Fourteenth District from July 2018 to June 2020, Coast Guard Cyber Command from 2016 to 2018, and served as the director of exercises and training (J7) of United States Cyber Command from 2014 to 2016.

A native of South Carolina, Lunday received his commission from the United States Coast Guard Academy in 1987, where he graduated with a B.S. degree in marine engineering. He holds a Juris Doctor from the George Washington University School of Law, an M.S. degree in national security strategy from the National War College and is a distinguished graduate of the College of Naval Command and Staff.

References

External links

1965 births
Living people
People from Columbia, South Carolina
United States Coast Guard Academy alumni
George Washington University Law School alumni
College of Naval Command and Staff alumni
National War College alumni
Recipients of the Coast Guard Distinguished Service Medal
Recipients of the Defense Superior Service Medal
Recipients of the Legion of Merit
United States Coast Guard admirals